T26 may refer to:

Rail and transit 
 GER Class T26, a steam tender locomotive
 Ritsurin-Kōen-Kitaguchi Station, in Takamatsu, Kagawa, Japan
 Shitennōji-mae Yūhigaoka Station, in Tennoji-ku, Osaka, Japan

Ships and boats 
 T26 (trimaran), a sailboat
 
 Type 26 frigate, of the Royal Navy

Weapons and armor 
 T-26, a Soviet tank
 T-26 Garand, an American prototype rifle
 T26 Pershing, an American prototype tank

Other uses 
 Junkers T 26, a German prototype trainer aircraft
 Slingsby T.26 Kite 2, a British glider
 Talbot Lago Record, an executive car